Insanity and Genius is the third studio album by Gamma Ray and final album with Ralf Scheepers on vocals.

Kai Hansen sings on the song "Heal Me", Dirk Schlächter sings on the song "Your Tørn Is Over". Continuing a trend that would conclude with its fifth studio release, the lineup for the album was changed from the previous one, with Jan Rubach replacing Uwe Wessel on bass and Thomas Nack replacing Uli Kusch on drums.

The album was re-released in 2002 with additional tracks. The 2002 version was released again in 2010 by Cooking Vinyl Records as part of a 2-CD set with the 2002 version of Land of the Free.

Track listing

"Heroes" also appears on the 2002 re-release of  Gamma Ray's 1991 album Sigh No More and is an alternative version of the song "Changes" from that album.
"Gamma Ray (extended version)" also appears on the Future Madhouse EP.
"Exciter" also appears on A Tribute to Judas Priest, Vol. 2: Delivering the Goods.
"Your Tørn Is Over" is referred to as "Your Turn Is Over" on the cover and in the booklet of the 2010 Cooking Vinyl Records 2CD joint-release of Insanity and Genius and Land of the Free (2002 re-release versions)

Anniversary Edition bonus disc

Personnel
Gamma Ray
 Ralf Scheepers – lead vocals (all but tracks 9 and 10)
 Kai Hansen – guitar, lead vocals on track 10, producer, engineer
 Dirk Schlächter – guitar, keyboards, lead vocals on track 9, producer, engineer
 Jan Rubach – bass guitar
 Thomas Nack – drums

Additional musicians
Sascha Paeth – computer engineering and additional keyboards

Production
Charlie Bauerfeind – mixing at Horus Sound Studio, Hannover
Achim Krause – mastering
Karl-Ulrich Walterbach – executive producer

Charts

References

1993 albums
Gamma Ray (band) albums
Noise Records albums
Albums produced by Kai Hansen